RAF Weston-on-the-Green is a Royal Air Force station that was redeveloped after the Great War period. Much demolition took place (including the original 1916/1917 hangars). The former RFC Officers and Sergeant's messes are located on the opposite side of the road, and are now in commercial use. The station is located near the village of Weston-on-the-Green in Oxfordshire, England.

RAF Weston-on-the-Green is one of the few remaining active RAF bases with some original pre-RAF buildings.

History

The airfield was used for the launch of the first modern hot air balloon in the UK in 1967, called the Bristol Belle. The airfield is the 3rd largest grass airfield still in operational use in the UK. It was previously used for the Hotspur gliders and Bristol Aircraft.

Current use

The station comes under the control of the nearby RAF Brize Norton, home of No.1 Parachute Training School RAF. The grass airfield at Weston is used regularly as a drop zone for military static line and freefall parachute training for the UK military, using C-130 Hercules aircraft based at RAF Brize Norton. No military aircraft are based at RAF Weston-on-the-Green and the airfield is manned only part-time by RAF personnel.

Sport skydiving also takes place at RAF Weston-on-the-Green under the auspices of the Royal Air Force Sports Parachute Association using civilian aircraft based on the airfield.

There was, until 2011, a commercial parachute club, Skydive Weston, based at the field. However that was forced to move its base of operations away from Weston by MoD cuts. Some of the original buildings still stand, and the Skyvan aircraft originally used is now used during weekdays.

Oxford Gliding Club

Among the various organisations that use the airfield, Oxford Gliding Club use it now. They operate on the weekends with various club gliders, and about 30 private gliders. The club owns one Schleicher ASK 13, one Schleicher ASK 21, 2 K 8s, 2 Grob Astir, one DG-505 and a Slingsby T.21. The club uses the hangar in the northern side of the airfield, however the launch point varies according to the wind. The club celebrated its 75th anniversary in 2012. It is one of the oldest gliding clubs in the country.

Current aircraft based at WOTG

RAF units and aircraft

See also 

 List of Royal Air Force stations

References

Citations

Bibliography

External links
Oxford Gliding Club
UK Military Aeronautical Information Publication – Weston on the-Green
Weston on the Green Drop Zone – Scheduled Para Training Sorties

Military parachuting in the United Kingdom
Weston-on-the-Green
Weston-on-